The Arizona Wildcats men's basketball statistical leaders are individual statistical leaders of the Arizona Wildcats men's basketball program in various categories, including points, rebounds, assists, steals, and blocks. Within those areas, the lists identify single-game, single-season, and career leaders. The Wildcats represent the University of Arizona in the NCAA's Pac-12 Conference.

Arizona began competing in intercollegiate basketball in 1904. However, the school's record book does not generally list records from before the 1950s, as records from before this period are often incomplete and inconsistent. Since scoring was much lower in this era, and teams played much fewer games during a typical season, it is likely that few or no players from this era would appear on these lists anyway.

The NCAA did not officially record assists as a stat until the 1983–84 season, and blocks and steals until the 1985–86 season, but Arizona's record books includes players in these stats before these seasons. These lists are updated through the end of the 2021–22 season.

Scoring

Rebounds

Assists

Steals

Blocks

Triple Doubles

1,000 Point Club
As of December 22, 2022 53 players have scored at least 1,000 points for the University of Arizona Men's Basketball team.  Link Richmond was the first Arizona player to reach 1,000 total points and Ąžuolas Tubelis is the most recent player.

 Sean Elliott − 2,555
 Bob Elliott − 2,131
 Jason Gardner − 1,984
 Salim Stoudamire − 1,960
 Khalid Reeves − 1,925
 Damon Stoudamire − 1,849
 Hassan Adams − 1,818
 Michael Dickerson − 1,791
 Channing Frye − 1,789
 Al Fleming − 1,765
 Chase Budinger − 1,697

 Miles Simon − 1,664
 Chris Mills − 1,619
 Anthony Cook − 1,590
 Ąžuolas Tubelis − 1,510
 Sean Rooks − 1,497
 Michael Wright − 1,491
 Bill Warner − 1,462
 Jason Terry − 1,461
 Steve Kerr − 1,445
 Solomon Hill − 1,430
 Joe Nehls − 1,409

 Ernie McCray − 1,349
 Kyle Fogg − 1,341
 Nick Johnson − 1,333
 Frank Smith − 1,329
 Mustafa Shakur − 1,318
 Allonzo Trier − 1,307
 Ivan Radenovic − 1,300
 Nic Wise − 1,285
 Link Richmond − 1,246
 Derrick Williams − 1,227
 Ed Nymeyer − 1,225

 Jordan Hill − 1,208
 Coniel Norman − 1,194
 Kaleb Tarczewski − 1,185
 Dušan Ristić − 1,181
 Luke Walton − 1,179
 Ray Owes − 1,178
 Craig McMillan − 1,174
 Herman Harris − 1,158
 Jud Buechler − 1,144
 Gabe York − 1,143
 Phil Taylor − 1,127

 Gilbert Arenas − 1,105
 A.J. Bramlett − 1,098
 Albert Johnson − 1,090
 Joseph Blair − 1,086
 Mike Bibby − 1,061
 Matt Othick − 1,055
 Roger Johnson − 1,046
 Joe Skaisgir − 1,034
 Matt Muehlebach − 1,006

References

Arizona
Statistical